Adelaide Eliza Scott Ironside (17 November 1831 – 15 April 1867) was an Australian artist. Three of her paintings were donated to Australian national collections, but in 1888 they were in "a shed". They were then in Sydney University and "The Marriage at Cana" is at the Art Gallery of New South Wales

Life
Ironside was born in Sydney, only surviving child of James Ironside, commission agent, and his wife Martha Rebecca, née Redman. Her grandfather was Sydney's Chief Gaoler and had been himself transported to Australia for forgery. She was educated by her mother and from a young age showed literary ability, contributing to the press both in prose and verse. In 1855 she decided to study painting in Europe, and towards the end of that year went with her mother to London. She was said to be the first Australian born woman artist to study abroad. She had a letter of introduction to Sir James Clark, through whom she met John Ruskin who showed much interest in her work. From London Ironside went to Rome, worked hard to become an artist and remained there for the rest of her life. Ironside was visited by the Prince of Wales and William Charles Wentworth, who each paid £500 for a painting.

In 1862 Ironside was represented in the New South Wales court of the London Great Exhibition, and her two pictures received good reviews from the critics. In Rome she had an excellent reputation as a painter, at the time of her death a fellow artist spoke of her flowers "painted as never were flowers painted before . . . her rich Titian-like colouring united to a purity of feeling that recalled the visions of Beato Angelico".

Ironside died in Rome on 15 April 1867 of tuberculosis. She taken back to London and interred at West Norwood Cemetery.

Good as her reputation was in Rome she was soon forgotten in her native country, and no specimen of her work is in any of its national galleries. Three of her pictures, The Pilgrim of Art, The Marriage in Cana, and The Presentation of the Magi were sent to Australia and lent to the national gallery at Sydney, where Francis Adams found them about 1888 stored "in a sort of shed" as there was "not room enough in the gallery". Adams praised them highly, and suggested that room might be found in the Melbourne gallery by taking out three by George Folingsby, and putting Miss Ironside's pictures in their place. They eventually found a home in the dining hall of St Paul's College, Sydney University. The Marriage at Cana of Galilee was presented to the Art Gallery of New South Wales in 1992 by the Warden and Fellows of the college.

References

External links 

 Adelaide Eliza Ironside at Australian Art
 Works by Adelaide Ironside, The Collection, Art Gallery New South Wales

1831 births
1867 deaths
Burials at West Norwood Cemetery
Australian women painters
19th-century Australian women artists
19th-century Australian painters